Stanthorpe railway station is located on the Southern line in Queensland, Australia, serving the town of Stanthorpe.

History
Stanthorpe station opened on 3 March 1881, when the Queensland Railway's Southern line was extended from Warwick. It served as the terminus of the line until it was extended to Wallangarra on 14 February 1887.

In April 1927, the station was visited by the Duke and Duchess of York.

Services
Until 1972, Stanthorpe was served by passenger trains operating between Brisbane and Wallangarra. The station remains in place and is used as a calling point by Downs Explorer (formerly the Southern Downs Steam Railway) heritage services.

References

External links

Stanthorpe Station History of Western Australian Railway & Stations gallery
Stanthorpe When there were Stations gallery

Darling Downs
Railway stations in Australia opened in 1881
Regional railway stations in Queensland
Stanthorpe, Queensland
Southern railway line, Queensland